The 2012 Canoe Sprint European Championships was held on 22–24 June at Zagreb, Croatia.

Medal table

Medal overview

Men

Women

References

External links

Canoe Sprint European Championships
Canoe Sprint European Championships
2011 Canoe Sprint European Championships
2012 Canoe Sprint European Championships
European Sprint Championships
Canoeing in Croatia
June 2012 sports events in Europe
2010s in Zagreb